Beck's American Translation is an abbreviated version of "The Holy Bible:  An American Translation" by William F. Beck (abbreviated BECK, but also AAT; not to be confused with Smith/Goodspeed's earlier "An American Translation" , which is abbreviated AAT or SGAT).  The Lutheran Church–Missouri Synod's Concordia Publishing House published his "An American Translation--The New Testament In The Language Of Today" in 1963.

The preface to the 1976 Bicentennial edition, written by Herman Otten, states:

Beck wanted his translation to become the official translation of the Lutheran Church–Missouri Synod, but the synod has no official English translation.

See also 
List of English Bible translations

External links
Christian News is the current publisher / distributor

Beck's American Translations
Beck's American Translation
1976 in Christianity
Lutheran Church–Missouri Synod